The Charlo station is a flag stop Via Rail station in the village of Charlo, New Brunswick, Canada. Charlo is served by Via Rail's Montreal-Halifax train, the Ocean.

The station was demolished, along with nearby Jacquet River station, in October 2021.

External links

 Via Rail page for the Ocean

Via Rail stations in New Brunswick
Rail transport in Restigouche County, New Brunswick
Buildings and structures in Restigouche County, New Brunswick